The Wake Forest Demon Deacons are the intercollegiate athletic teams that represent Wake Forest University, located in Winston-Salem, North Carolina. They compete at the National Collegiate Athletic Association (NCAA) Division I level as a member of the Atlantic Coast Conference (ACC).

Wake Forest has won a total of nine national championships in five different sports; five of these championships have come since 2002. Wake Forest is sometimes referred to as being a part of "Tobacco Road" or "The Big Four", terms that refer to the four North Carolina schools that compete heatedly against each other within the ACC; these include Duke University, North Carolina, and North Carolina State, as well as Wake Forest.

Originally, Wake Forest's athletic teams were known as The Old Gold and Black or the Baptists, due to its association with the Baptist Convention (from which it later separated itself). However, in 1923, after a particularly impressive win against Trinity College (predecessor of Duke University) a newspaper reporter wrote that the Deacons "fought like Demons", giving rise to the current team name, the "Demon Deacons".

The Athletics Director was Ron Wellman, who won multiple Athletic Director of the Year Awards for his work during the 2007–2008 school year. In 2019, Wellman announced his retirement, effective May 1, 2019. On March 2, 2019, Wake Forest named alum John Currie as its new athletics director.

Teams

Football

Wake Forest's football team was ranked in the Top 25 in the nation by the AP Poll during most of the 2006 season. They won the 2006 ACC Atlantic Division Title and the 2006 ACC Conference Championship by defeating the Georgia Tech Yellow Jackets 9–6 on December 2 in the ACC Championship Game in Jacksonville, Florida. The win sent Wake Forest to the Orange Bowl to play Big East champion Louisville, where they lost to the Cardinals. This made Wake Forest the smallest school to ever compete in the Bowl Championship Series. Of all schools that play Division I FBS football, only Rice and Tulsa have smaller undergraduate enrollments, and Wake has the smallest undergraduate enrollment of any school in the Power Five conferences.

For his part in the record-setting season, coach Jim Grobe was unanimously selected ACC Coach of the Year, and handily won the AP Coach of the Year award several weeks later.  Coach Grobe signed a ten-year contract in 2007.

Wake Forest followed its success in 2006 with another excellent year and finished the regular season with a record of 8 wins and 4 losses. During the season, the Demon Deacons were briefly ranked in the Top 25. Their success throughout the year earned Wake Forest an invitation to the Meineke Car Care Bowl in Charlotte, North Carolina. Played on December 29 in the Bank of America stadium (home of the Carolina Panthers) the Demon Deacons defeated the Connecticut Huskies 24–10.

Wake Forest plays its home football games at BB&T Field (formerly Groves Stadium).

Basketball

Men's basketball

Wake Forest is generally regarded as a competitive program in men's basketball, frequently qualifying for the NCAA Men's Division I Basketball Championship (20 times in the school's history). The men's basketball team has made 16 straight postseason appearances (through their NIT appearance in 2006), the longest such streak in the ACC. They reached the Final Four once, in 1962. The school's famous basketball alumni include Billy Packer, a guard on the 1962 Final Four team who became far more famous as a basketball broadcaster; "Muggsy" Bogues, the shortest player ever to play in the NBA; Randolph Childress, for his MVP performance in the 1995 ACC Tournament; Dallas Mavericks star Josh Howard; 2006 NBA Rookie of the Year Award winner and Phoenix Suns star Chris Paul; and two-time league MVP, three-time NBA Finals MVP and five-time NBA Champion, San Antonio Spurs forward Tim Duncan. Lawrence Joel Veterans Memorial Coliseum is the home venue for the Demon Deacons basketball team. Skip Prosser, Wake Forest University's men's basketball coach since 2001, died in Winston-Salem on July 26, 2007. One of Prosser's assistant coaches, Dino Gaudio, was named to replace him.
After the firing of Dino Guadio at the end of the 2010 season, Wake Forest hired Jeff Bzdelik as their head basketball coach.  Jeff Bzdelik resigned as head basketball coach on March 20, 2014. Steve Forbes is now the head coach of Wake Forest.

Women's basketball

The women's team have played since 1971, and they have been to the NCAA Tournament just twice, in 1988 and 2021. They have reached the ACC Tournament semifinals in 1986, 1988, and 2012.

Women's field hockey
Recent athletic honors include three consecutive NCAA Field Hockey national championships in 2002, 2003, and 2004 under Head Coach Jennifer Averill. In 2005, the Deacs were defeated in the semifinal round by Duke University, in the 2006 championship game by the University of Maryland, and in the 2018 semifinal round by North Carolina. The Deacs have contended for the National Championship 18 times, the most recent in 2022. Other championships include the 2002, 2003, 2006, and 2014 ACC Tournament championships.

Golf

The men's golf team has had several successful years, winning national championships in 1974, 1975, and 1986. The team also finished as national runner-ups on four other occasions in 1969, 1970, 1987, 1997. Three Demon Deacons have won the individual national title: Curtis Strange in 1974, Jay Haas in 1975, and Gary Hallberg in 1979. Since the NCAA went to pre-national championship regional competitions in 1989, Wake Forest has won three regionals: 2005 (East), 2006 (East), and 2008 (Central).

They have won 19 conference championships:
Southern Conference (1): 1950
Atlantic Coast Conference (18): 1955, 1957–58, 1963, 1967–76, 1978–80, 1989

The women's golf team has had some success as well. They won 5 ACC team championships in 1986, 1994, 1995, 2009, and 2010. They had also won 7 ACC individual championships in 1986, 1993, 1995, 1998, 2009, 2010, and 2011. In the NCAA regionals, they had won their region twice, 1994 (East) and 1995 (East). Jennifer Kupcho won the individual national title in 2018 and the Augusta National Women's Amateur in 2019.

Several well-known players include Arnold Palmer, Lanny Wadkins, Jay Haas, Billy Andrade, Bill Haas, Curtis Strange, Robert Wrenn, Scott Hoch, Webb Simpson, Will Zalatoris, and Grayson Murray.

Soccer

Wake Forest is a consistent national title contender in men's soccer. In recent years several players from the program have played professionally in Major League Soccer, including Brian Carroll, Will Hesmer, Brian Edwards, Michael Lahoud, Michael Parkhurst, James Riley, Scott Sealy, Sam Cronin, and Wells Thompson. In 2006 the team advanced to the final four of the NCAA tournament where they were defeated in a penalty kick shootout by the University of California, Santa Barbara. They captured the 2007 NCAA Division I Men's Soccer Championship defeating Ohio State.

Tennis

Noah Rubin played for Wake Forest; he had won the 2014 boys singles championship at Wimbledon, and the US 2014 boys' national championships in singles and doubles. In 2014-15 for Wake Forest he was an All-American and the runner-up in the 2015 NCAA singles championship.

The Wake Forest Men's Tennis team won the NCAA Division I Team National Championship in 2018, beating runner-up Ohio State 4-2 at the Wake Forest Tennis Complex. That Demon Deacons team was led by freshman Bar Botzer, who clinched the National Championship. Wake also won the ITA Division I National Men's Team Indoor Tennis Championship in 2018.

Women's volleyball
Women's volleyball is a varsity sport at Wake Forest. The team is part of the Atlantic Coast Conference (ACC). In March 2019 head volleyball coach Bill Ferguson was indicted and charged with racketeering as part of the 2019 college admissions bribery scandal, in which he is accused of accepting $100,000 to help a student get into Wake Forest illegally as a purported volleyball recruit. The university placed Ferguson on administrative leave. He later resign in August 2019.

Baseball

Wake Forest won the 1955 College World Series in baseball. Starting in 2009, they will be playing on Ernie Shore Field, in Winston-Salem.

Championships

NCAA team championships
Wake Forest has won 9 NCAA team national championships.

Men's (6)
Baseball (1):  1955
Golf (3): 1974, 1975, 1986
Soccer (1): 2007
Tennis (1): 2018
Women's (3)
Field Hockey  (3): 2002, 2003, 2004
see also:
ACC NCAA team championships
List of NCAA schools with the most NCAA Division I championships

NCAA individual championships
Men's
Golf (3): Curtis Strange (1974), Jay Haas (1975), Gary Hallberg (1979)
Outdoor track & field (2): Andy Bloom (1996 shot put & 1996 discus throw)
Indoor track & field (1): Michael Bingham (2009 400m)
Tennis (1): Petros Chrysochos (2018)
Women's
Tennis (1): Bea Bielik (2002)
Outdoor track & field (1): Michelle Sikes (2007 5000m)
Golf (1): Jennifer Kupcho (2018)

ACC Athlete of the Year

Male Athlete of the Year

Female Athlete of the Year

Screamin' Demons
Student attendance of Wake Forest football and basketball games was formerly high, in part due to the program known as "Screamin' Demons". At the beginning of each respective athletic season students on the Reynolda Campus can sign up for the program whereby they pay $15 for each season; in addition to the slightly better seats than the other students in football (not enforced) and seats behind the rim in basketball, this gets students a football shirt in the fall and a tie-dye T-shirt in the spring along with a card that serves as an automatic pass to the sporting events. They lose this privilege if they miss two of the games. Most students sign up because ticket distribution to non-Screamin' Demons is unreliable.  Through the planning of Sports Marketing and the Screamin' Demons program, basketball game seats in the students section are difficult to attain without participating in the Screamin' Demons program. In 2011, sports marketing lowered the student allotment, and very few students currently attend.

References

External links